Pedro Emanuel Costa Agostinho (born 20 February 1965) is a Portuguese sprinter. He competed in the men's 100 metres at the 1988 Summer Olympics.

References

External links
 

1965 births
Living people
Athletes (track and field) at the 1988 Summer Olympics
Athletes (track and field) at the 1992 Summer Olympics
Portuguese male sprinters
Olympic athletes of Portugal